Ariadne ariadne, the angled castor, is a species of nymphalid butterfly found in Asia.

Description 

This butterfly is orange brown with wavy lines running across. The margin is somewhat wavy and appearing truncated at the apex of the forewing. The margin is wavy with a large angle present on the fifth vein interspace and at the tip of vein three. The tornus is broadly angulate. The hindwing termen is deeply scalloped. There is a prominent white spot towards the apex of the forewing. The cilia are white, alternated with brown. On the underside there is more brown.

Antennae, head, thorax and abdomen ochraceous rufous. Males have a series of dark shining scales (androconia) on the subcostal vein, veins 6 and 7 and a patch on the underside of the forewing towards the base. Females look similar but are slightly paler and lacking the androconial scales.

Ariadne ariadne bears much resemblance to Ariadne merione, the common castor, but in the angled castor, the transverse chestnut bands are narrower and less diffuse. The margins of the common castor are less wavy.

Food plants 
The castor plant (Ricinus communis) is the most common host and gives the butterfly its name. Other hosts include Tragia cannabina, Tragia hispida, Tragia plukenetii and Tragia involucrata.

Larva 
The caterpillars are spiny with two rows of spines on the top. Finer spines emerge between these rows. An irregular set of small spines form a cluster at the end. The colour is variable, sometimes green with longitudinal dark brown lines, or dark brown with an interrupted broad dorsal stripe of pure white, not extending to either end.

Pupa 
"Slender, wing-cases somewhat dilated, a dorsal protuberance and two small cephalic points: colour variable: rigidly attached by the tail, so that if the surface is vertical, the pupa stands out horizontally." (Davidson & Aitken.)

References 

Biblidinae
Butterflies described in 1763
Butterflies of Asia
Taxa named by Carl Linnaeus